The 2017 JLT One-Day Cup was the 48th season of the official List A domestic cricket competition in Australia. It was played over a four-week period at the start of the domestic season to separate its schedule from the Sheffield Shield season. The tournament was held in Sydney, Brisbane, Perth and Hobart, with all 23 matches to be broadcast live on the Cricket Australia website and app. It was the first time in more than a decade that neither the Nine Network nor Fox Sports (Australia) have hosted a television broadcast of the tournament. The tournament was sponsored by Jardine Lloyd Thompson.

New South Wales were the defending champions. They were eliminated from the tournament after losing their final group fixture to Victoria, when the match was abandoned due to an unsafe pitch. The win gave Victoria a bonus-point victory, knocking New South Wales out of the competition. However, Cricket Australia were conducting a "thorough investigation" into the outcome of the match.

Western Australia finished top of the group stage, progressing directly to the final. South Australia and Victoria finished second and third respectively, progressing to the elimination final. South Australia won the elimination match by 176 runs. In the final, Western Australia beat South Australia by 6 wickets.

Points table

RESULT POINTS:

 Win – 4
 Tie – 2 each
 No Result – 2 each
 Loss – 0
 Bonus Point – 1 (Run rate 1.25 times that of opposition.)
 Additional Bonus Point – 1 (Run rate twice that of opposition.)

Squads
The following squads were named:

Fixtures

Elimination Final

Final

Statistics

Most Runs

Most wickets

See also
 2017–18 Sheffield Shield season

References

External links
 JLT One-Day Cup 2017 on Cricket.com.au
 Series home at ESPN Cricinfo

JLT One-Day Cup
Australian domestic limited-overs cricket tournament seasons
JLT One-Day Cup